TGC-1 (also referred as TGK-1; full name: Territorial generating company number 1; , Territorial’naya generiruyushchaya kompaniya No 1; traded as ) is a regional power company operating in North-West Russia. The company has its headquarters in Saint Petersburg with branches in Karelia and Kola.

History
The company was created in 2005 by the merger of Lenenergo, Kolenergo and Karelenergogeneratsiya power companies. Formation of the new company was announced on 1 March 2005 by Lenenergo, Kolenergo and RAO UES. The company was officially registered on 25 March 2005 and began to operate on 1 October 2005. The integration of predecessor companies was completed on 1 November 2006. The majority shareholder of this time was RAO UES.

Operations
The company operates 52 thermal, hydro and co-generation stations in Saint Petersburg, Leningrad Oblast, Murmansk Oblast and Karelia. It has an installed generation capacity of 6,92 GW of electric power. In addition, TGC-1 is the major supplier of district heating in Saint Petersburg, Petrozavodsk, Murmansk, Apatity and Kirovsk with 13,49 thous GCal/hr of heating capacity.

The company operates through three branches – Nevsky, Karelsky and Kolsky. TGC-1 includes the following subsidiaries: JSC Murmanskaya CHPP (power supply of Murmansk and surrounding areas, share in authorised capital — 98.85%), JSC St. Petersburg Heating Grid (connection of heating networks in the area of operation of the Company's CHPPs, share in authorised capital of 65.58%), as well as dependent companies of JSC HHC (transfer of heat energy from the Apatitskaya CHPP to consumers in the city of Kirovsk, with a share in authorised capital of 50%) and TGC-Service LLC (specialised repair company, share in authorised capital - 26%).

Shareholders
The company's main shareholder is Gazprom through its power generation holding Gazprom Energoholding, which owns 51.79% of shares. Finnish Fortum owns 29.45% of shares. The company shares are traded at the Russian Trading System and the Moscow Interbank Currency Exchange.

References

External links 

 

 
Electric power companies of Russia
Companies established in 2005
Companies listed on the Moscow Exchange
Gazprom subsidiaries
Companies based in Saint Petersburg
Fortum